Gaozong Emperor can refer to several Emperors of China, such as:

Emperor Gaozong of Tang, ruling from 649 to 683.
Emperor Gaozong of Song, founder of the Southern Song dynasty, ruling from 1127 to 1162.

See also
Gaozong (disambiguation)